Battor Dugame is the capital of the North Tongu District, which is one of the districts of the Volta Region, Ghana.

District Change 
Battor Dugame became part of Central Tongu District as it became an administrative capital in 2012.

References 

Volta Region